Kalen Ballage (born December 22, 1995) is an American football running back for the San Antonio Brahmas of the XFL. He played college football at Arizona State and was drafted by the Miami Dolphins in the fourth round of the 2018 NFL Draft. He also previously played for the New York Jets, Pittsburgh Steelers, and Los Angeles Chargers.

Early years
While attending Falcon High School in Falcon, Colorado, Ballage recorded a successful high school football career. In three years on varsity, he rushed for 2,690 yards, while averaging 8.5 yards per carry and scored 35 rushing touchdowns, in addition to 671 receiving yards and 12 receiving touchdowns. Ballage was recruited by major programs, including Michigan, Washington, and Nebraska. He committed to Arizona State on January 17, 2013.

College career
As a freshman in 2014, Ballage had a combined 202 rushing and receiving yards, to go along with four total touchdowns. During his sophomore year, he had the first 100-yard rushing performance of his career against the Oregon Ducks. As a junior, Ballage tied College Football's FBS single game touchdown record by scoring eight touchdowns against Texas Tech on September 10, 2016. During his junior year, Ballage played the quarterback position while the team was in their version of the wildcat offense, known to ASU fans as the Sparky Package. Ballage is known for his combination of speed and power.

Collegiate statistics

Professional career

Miami Dolphins
Ballage was drafted by the Miami Dolphins in the fourth round with the 131st overall pick of the 2018 NFL Draft, using the fourth round pick previously acquired from the Philadelphia Eagles in a trade that sent Jay Ajayi to Philadelphia. In Week 4, against the New England Patriots, he made his NFL debut and recorded a three-yard rush in the 38–7 loss. In Week 15, against the Minnesota Vikings, he saw an expanded role with 12 carries for 123 yards and a touchdown. Overall, he finished his rookie season with 191 rushing yards and a touchdown.

Ballage entered the 2019 season as the No. 2 running back behind Kenyan Drake. He was placed on injured reserve on December 3, 2019, with a leg injury. He finished the season with 135 rushing yards and three touchdowns along with 14 catches for 63 yards through 12 games and six starts.

On August 27, 2020, the Dolphins attempted to trade Ballage to the New York Jets for a 2021 conditional seventh-round draft pick, but the trade was voided three days later after he failed a physical with the Jets. He was waived with an injury settlement on September 5, 2020.

New York Jets
On September 15, 2020, Ballage was signed by the New York Jets. He was waived on October 5.

Los Angeles Chargers
On October 9, 2020, Ballage was signed to the Los Angeles Chargers practice squad. He was elevated to the active roster on November 7 for the team's week 9 game against the Las Vegas Raiders, and reverted to the practice squad after the game. He was promoted to the active roster on November 14. In the 2020 season, he appeared in 11 games, of which he started two. He finished with 91 carries for 303 rushing yards and three rushing touchdowns to go along with 29 receptions for 166 receiving yards.

Pittsburgh Steelers
Ballage signed a one-year contract with the Pittsburgh Steelers on March 30, 2021. He appeared in all 17 games in the 2021 season. He was used mainly in a special teams role.

On November 2, 2022, the Indianapolis Colts hosted Ballage for a workout.

San Antonio Brahmas

Ballage was selected in the sixth  round of the 2023 XFL Draft, by the San Antonio Brahmas.

References

External links

Arizona State Sun Devils bio

1995 births
Living people
People from El Paso County, Colorado
Players of American football from Colorado
African-American players of American football
American football running backs
Arizona State Sun Devils football players
Miami Dolphins players
New York Jets players
Los Angeles Chargers players
Pittsburgh Steelers players
San Antonio Brahmas players
21st-century African-American sportspeople